"What's the Use of Getting Sober (When You Gonna Get Drunk Again)" is a song written by Busby Meyers, performed by Louis Jordan and his Tympany Five, recorded in July 1942, and released on the Decca label (catalog no. 8645). The "B" side of the record was "The Chicks I Pick Are Slender and Tender and Tall". 

The record peaked at No. 1 on Billboards race record chart and remained on the chart for 14 weeks. It was Jordan's first No. 1 record.

In a November 1942 review in The Billboard, M. H. Orodenker wrote: "The trumpet, with plenty of 'hicks' to his hot horn licks, establishes the mood right from the edge."

The song was included in the 1977 compilation, The Best of Louis Jordan. It was covered by Joe Jackson on his 1981 release Joe Jackson's Jumpin' Jive.

References

1942 songs
Louis Jordan songs